Hassall is a village and civil parish in the Borough of Cheshire East and the ceremonial county of Cheshire, England. The civil parish contains the very small hamlet of Day Green.  According to the 2001 United Kingdom census, the population was 281, reducing to 265 at the 2011 Census.

See also

Listed buildings in Hassall
Hassall Hall

References

External links

Villages in Cheshire
Civil parishes in Cheshire